Five Block is an unincorporated community in Logan County, West Virginia, United States.  It is named after the Five Block coal seam that runs through the area.

References 

Unincorporated communities in West Virginia
Unincorporated communities in Logan County, West Virginia